Samir Upadhyay, the founder of Spiralogics Inc, is a Nepalese currently staying in the United States. He has completed his Bachelors in Computer Science from Southern Arkansas University. He recently produced a Nepali feature film Anaagat starring Priyanka Karki & Arpan Thapa in the lead.

References

Nepalese film producers
Year of birth missing (living people)
Living people